John 'Jackie' Millsopp (17 July 1930 – 17 September 1952) was a Scottish footballer who played for Celtic.

Career and death
Having joined as a youth player from Junior club Blantyre Celtic three years earlier, Millsopp made his debut for Celtic in a Glasgow Cup tie against Queens Park in September 1950.

Capable of playing in several positions, by 1952 he was establishing himself in the Celtic side when he suffered a burst appendix; he died in hospital from complications shortly afterwards at the age of 22.

Players from Celtic and Old Firm rivals Rangers were among a large crowd of mourners who attended the funeral in Millsopp's home town of Cambuslang, which took place on the morning of a match between the teams on 20 September 1952.

References 

1930 births
1952 deaths
Sportspeople from Cambuslang
Association football midfielders
Scottish footballers
Celtic F.C. players
Scottish Football League players
Scottish Junior Football Association players
Blantyre Celtic F.C. players
Deaths from appendicitis
Footballers from South Lanarkshire